Eupithecia kozlovi is a moth in the family Geometridae. It is found in Kyrghyzstan and Mongolia.

References

Moths described in 1973
kozlovi
Moths of Asia